Julien Kapek (born 12 January 1979 in Clamart, Hauts-de-Seine) is a French triple jumper.

His personal best is 17.38 metres, achieved in July 2006 in Tomblaine. This result places him fourth on the all-time French performers list, only behind Serge Hélan and Karl Taillepierre.

Achievements

See also
List of doping cases in athletics

References

External links

1979 births
Living people
People from Clamart
French male triple jumpers
Athletes (track and field) at the 2004 Summer Olympics
Olympic athletes of France
Athletes (track and field) at the 2005 Mediterranean Games
Mediterranean Games competitors for France
Sportspeople from Hauts-de-Seine